Fluffy is a 1965 American comedy film written by Samuel Roeca, directed by Earl Bellamy, and starring Tony Randall and Shirley Jones (with an uncharacteristic brunette hairstyle). The storyline concerns a scientist's effort to prove that a wild animal (in this case, a lion named Fluffy) can be made into a pet with proper training.

Plot

Cast
 Tony Randall as Professor Daniel Potter
 Shirley Jones as Janice Claridge
 Edward Andrews as Griswald
 Howard Morris as Sweeney
 Ernest Truex as Mr. Claridge
 Jim Backus as Sergeant
 Frank Faylen as Catfish
 Celia Kaye as Sally Brighton
 Dick Sargent as Tommy
 Adam Roarke as Bob Brighton
 Whit Bissell as Dr. Braden
 Harriet MacGibbon as Mrs. Claridge
 Jim Boles as Pete
 Parley Baer as Police Captain
 Connie Gilchrist as Maid
 Stuart Randall as State Trooper
 Sammee Tong as Cook
 Barry O'Hara as Fireman #2
 Sam Gilman as Policeman
 Milton Frome as Tweedy Physicist
 Doodles Weaver as Yokel

External links
 
 

1965 films
1965 comedy films
American comedy films
1960s French-language films
Films about lions
Films directed by Earl Bellamy
Films set in Los Angeles
Films shot in Kenya
Universal Pictures films
1960s English-language films
1960s American films